The Alsace-Lorraine A 2 was a class of German  express passenger locomotives. In 1906 the Imperial Railways in Alsace-Lorraine (Reichseisenbahnen in Elsaß-Lothringen) reclassified them as P 2.

History 
After the Franco-Prussian War (1870–1871), the territory of Alsace and Lorraine was transferred from France to the newly-formed German Empire. With the acquisition, came the route network in Alsace-Lorraine. However, the previous operator, the French Chemins de fer de l'Est had moved all its rolling stock west. The new owners had to procure a fleet of locomotives, carriages and wagons quickly.

The fifteen A 2 locomotives had originally been built by Strousberg for the Halle-Sorau-Gubener Railway Company. However, they were not there long, as the Reichseisenbahnen acquired them immediately after delivery. The locomotives were given the numbers 3 to 17 and the names of various German rivers.

The locomotives were first used in express train service; they later migrated to ordinary passenger train service. In 1907, there were still thirteen locomotives in operation, but they were all retired by 1912.

Design 
The locomotives had an inside frame. The boiler had a slightly protuberant Belpaire firebox. The ash pan reached far below the dome centreline. The Reichseisenbahnen operated the locomotives with a reduced boiler pressure of  instead of the possible . The steam dome was on the rear ring of the boiler. In front of this was the sand dome, which only fed the front of the leading driving wheelset.

The cylinders (two) were mounted horizontally outside the frame. Allan valve gear was used, mounted inside the frame. The connecting rod was attached to the leading driving wheelset.

The suspension was carried out by means of leaf spring packages below the axleboxes. The balance levers between the axles were later removed to increase the size of the firebox.

Originally the locomotives only had a handbrake on the tender; later, an air brake was installed.

Fleet list

References 

 

2-4-0 locomotives
A02
Hanomag locomotives
Railway locomotives introduced in 1870
1B n2 locomotives
Passenger locomotives